Syritta austeni is a species of syrphid fly in the family Syrphidae.

Distribution
Sierra Leone.

References

Eristalinae
Diptera of Africa
Taxa named by Mario Bezzi
Insects described in 1915